Three ships and a shore establishment of the Royal Navy have borne the name HMS Quebec, after the city of Quebec in Canada:

Ships
  was a 32-gun fifth rate launched in 1760 and blown up in action with French in 1779.
  was a schooner purchased in 1775 and wrecked later that year.
  was a 32-gun fifth rate launched in 1781 and broken up in 1816.

Shore establishments
  was a combined training centre (No 1 CTC) at Inveraray between 1940 and 1946. Now Argyll Caravan Site.
 HMS Quebec II was the headquarters of the commanding officer of the northern patrol and Combined Operations Staff Officer Training Centre at Hollywood Hotel in Largs between 1941 and 1942.

See also
 
 
 , subsequently , originally MV Port Quebec

Royal Navy ship names